The Sayonara Player is an audio software player for Linux and BSD.

History
Its developer, Michael Lugmair, used the Qt widget toolkit as well as the multimedia framework GStreamer, to develop the player. Sayonara is free software under the GPL-3.0-or-later license.

Characteristics

Installation 
Sayonara can typically be installed under Linux with the distribution-specific package management. For some Linux distributions, including Ubuntu and Fedora, installation instructions are available on the website of the player. The package is listed in the Arch Linux repository.

User interface 
The Sayonara player has a graphical user interface. A dark mode is included in the skin. The window is divided into the player itself, where controls, track data and the cover can be seen, the playlist, and the music library. The library is structured as follows: Either a tabular listing of artists and albums or a cover view. Sayonara can manage several playlists.

Database 
Large music collections can be managed in one or more databases. The database reads most common tag fields including the rating tag. The results of a search query are displayed either as quickly as possible during entering or after confirmation with the enter key.

Scope of functions 
Some functions of the player are:
 Music playback with Crossfader and Equalizer
 Frequency spectrum and level display
 Music database with search function, cover display and genre filter
 Management of several databases
 Management of multiple playlists
 Last.fm Scrobbling: Automatic addition of songs to the playlist
 Access to web streams and podcasts
 Cover display: support for integrated covers and online services
 Metadata Editor
 Display of lyrics (retrievable from different web services)
 Player available in various languages

References 

Audio player software for Linux
Audio player software that uses Qt